Beryllophantis alphophora is a species of moth of the family Tortricidae. It is found in Papua New Guinea.

The wingspan is 12.5–13.5 mm for males and about 14 mm for females. The forewings are pale greenish, with an emerald green tinge, patterned with darker, duller green fasciae with an olive hue and a whitish central patch. The hindwings are silvery white at the base, becoming increasingly beige towards the apex, and indistinctly mottled in the apical half.

References

Moths described in 1979
Tortricini
Moths of Papua New Guinea
Taxa named by Marianne Horak